Charles Chester (7 February 1869 – 9 February 1940) was an English cricketer who played for Derbyshire. He was born in Eastwood and died in Mansfield. Chester was a right-handed batsman and a right-arm medium-pace bowler.

Chester played in one match during the 1899 season against Marylebone Cricket Club, but was stumped in the first innings and bowled in the second, scoring a duck both times. When called up to bowl during the match, he took one wicket for nine runs.

External links
Charles Chester at Cricket Archive 

1869 births
1940 deaths
English cricketers
Derbyshire cricketers
People from Eastwood, Nottinghamshire
Cricketers from Nottinghamshire